Ciudad Barrios is a city in the San Miguel department of El Salvador. Ciudad Barrios is one of the most cultural places in El Salvador with a lot of attractions and it is the birthplace of Archbishop Óscar Romero, the first saint of El Salvador.

See also
Ciudad Barrios prison

Municipalities of the San Miguel Department (El Salvador)